Luxiaria phyllosaria is a moth of the family Geometridae first described by Francis Walker in 1860. It is found in Sri Lanka, the north-eastern Himalayas of India, Sumatra, Borneo, the Philippines and Sulawesi.

Dark brown fringes are found in the margins of both wings. A dark brown bar with grey.

References

External links
A review of Luxiaria Walker and its allied genus Calletaera Warren (Lepidoptera, Geometridae, Ennominae) from China
A molecular phylogeny of the Palaearctic and Oriental members of the tribe Boarmiini

Moths of Asia
Moths described in 1860